The Kellogg Switchboard and Supply Company was an American manufacturer of telecommunication equipment. Anticipating the expiration of the earliest, fundamental Bell System patents, Milo G. Kellogg, an electrical engineer, founded the company in 1897 in Chicago to produce telephone exchange equipment and telephone apparatus.

Along with Western Electric, which supplied the Bell System, Automatic Electric supplying General Telephone, and Stromberg-Carlson, also supplying the independent telephone markets, Kellogg shared in the business of providing the bulk of the nation's telephone equipment until after World War II.

History

Milo G. Kellogg was born into a prominent, wealthy New England family. He attended prep school, and received two degrees in engineering from the University of Rochester. He married a member of one of Chicago's most prestigious families, and relocated to Illinois.

In the 1880s, Kellogg was a manager at Western Electric as superintendent of its Chicago manufacturing and research plant, and also at the Southern Telephone and Telegraph Company. In 1897, with  expiring, Kellogg established a manufacturing firm, the Kellogg Switchboard & Supply Company. Kellogg himself held more than 150 patents, and had invented the divided multiple telephone switchboard, which became the flagship product of the new company. This switchboard offered greater flexibility and efficiency than earlier designs in handling a large telephone subscriber base at urban exchanges. Kellogg primarily supplied local independent telephone companies.

Fight for control
In 1901, Kellogg fell seriously ill. His brother-in-law, Wallace DeWolf, proved to be a poor manager. Concerned that the company might fail, DeWolf secretly sold a majority of Kellogg's stock to Western Electric.  Easily manipulated by Western Electric executives and legal advisors, DeWolf also helped Western Electric attempt to take over the country's other large telephone equipment manufacturer, Stromberg-Carlson.  A bitter stockholder fight ensued, which led to Stromberg-Carlson's reincorporation as a New York state corporation in 1902.

When Milo Kellogg recovered his health, and discovered what DeWolf had done, he sued to stop the sale of his stock. In two separate decisions by the Supreme Court of Illinois—Brown v. Cragg, 230 Ill. 299 (1907) and Dunbar v. American Telephone and Telegraph, 238 Ill. 456 (1909)—Kellogg retained ownership of his company.

1903 strike
In 1903, the Kellogg Switchboard and Supply Company was the target of a bitter strike by the Brass Molder's Union Local 83 and the International Brotherhood of Teamsters. Kellogg was supported by the Bell Telephone Trust (which at the time owned most of Kellogg Switchboard's stock), the Illinois Manufacturers' Association, and the Employers' Association of Chicago. Kellogg Switchboard sued to stop the Teamsters from engaging in their sympathy strike, and won an injunction forcing the drivers back to work. The Kellogg company refused to negotiate, fired nearly 90% of its workforce, and broke the strike.

Post-WWII history
The company prospered in the early 20th century. It introduced the Relaymatic automatic switching system in 1939 and a crossbar switching system in 1950.

The ITT Corporation purchased a controlling interest in the Kellogg Switchboard and Supply Company in 1951, rebranding the new division's equipment as ITT Kellogg for a decade. It then became ITT Telecommunications, but reverted to ITT Kellogg in 1986. Among ITT Kellogg's acquisitions in the 1950s was telephone manufacturer Federal Telephone and Radio.

In 1958, ITT Kellogg was a contractor to the U.S. Air Force, for which Kellogg build a ground communication system for the ballistic missile base at Cooke Air Force Base.

In 1989, ITT sold its telecommunications product lines, including ITT Kellogg, to Alcatel, now Alcatel-Lucent. The company's US operations were later sold and privatized. The remaining business of Kellogg is conducted by Cortelco Kellogg, owned by Cortelco (Corinth Telecommunications Corporation) and is based in Corinth, Mississippi.

On December 12, 2008 eOn Communications announced an agreement to acquire Cortelco Systems Holding Corporation.

References

Bibliography
Adams, Stephen B., and Butler, Orville R, Manufacturing the Future: A History of Western Electric. New York: Cambridge University Press, 1999. 
Clarke S.J., Chicago: Pictorial and Biographical. Vol. 2, Deluxe Supplement.  Chicago (1912).
Cohen, Andrew Wender, "Business Myths, Lawyerly Strategies, and Social Context: Ernst on Labor Law History." Law & Social Inquiry. 23:1 (January 1989). 
Cohen, Andrew Wender, The Racketeer's Progress: Chicago and the Struggle for the Modern American Economy, 1900-1940. New York: Cambridge University Press, 2004. 
Ernst, David R. Lawyers Against Labor: From Individual Rights to Corporate Liberalism. Champaign, Ill.: University of Illinois Press, 1995. 
Chicago Daily Tribute, Facing Defeat Unions Weaken (July 18, 1903)
Gable, Richard W., Birth of an Employers' Association., Business History Review, 33:4 (Winter, 1959).
Chicago Historical Society, Dictionary of Leading Chicago Businesses (1820-2000); Kellogg Switchboard & Supply Co. Chicago (2005).

External links

Telephone Archive
Official corporate history

History of Chicago
Defunct telecommunications companies of the United States
Defunct manufacturing companies based in Chicago
ITT Inc.
American companies established in 1897
Telecommunications companies established in 1897